The following is a list of films produced in the Kannada film industry in India in 1984, presented in alphabetical order.

See also

Kannada films of 1983
Kannada films of 1985

References

1984
Kannada
Films, Kannada